Reginald Abraham de Mel (8 November 1894 – 1961) was a Ceylonese politician. Having served as the Mayor of Colombo, he served as the Deputy Speaker and Chairman of Committees in the first parliament of Ceylon, until he was unseated by an election petition.

Early life and education
De Mel received his education at Richmond College in  Galle, where he represented the college cricket team. He qualified as a proctor.

Political career
Having been elected to the Colombo Municipal Council, he served as the Mayor of Colombo from 1944 to 1946.

De Mel was elected to parliament at the 1st parliamentary election, representing the United National Party (UNP), in the Colombo South electorate. He secured 6,452 votes (35.4% of the total vote), 640 votes ahead of Paikiasothy Saravanamuttu, an independent candidate, who received 32% of the total vote.
He was subsequently appointed the Deputy Speaker and Chairman of Committees in the first parliament of Ceylon. De Mel subsequently lost his seat in August 1948 after being found guilty of corrupt practices by aiding, abetting, counselling and procuring the offences of impersonation in an election petition filled by Saravanamuttu. Saravanamuttu contested the ensuing by-election held in Colombo South in November 1948 but again lost, this time to T. F. Jayewardene. The Duplication Road in Colombo was renamed R.A. De Mel Mawatha in his memory.

Family
He married Evelyn Fernando, daughter of Hethakandage Bastian Fernando. They had two children Laleeni and Irangani. C. H. Z. Fernando was his brother-in-law. He was a cousin of R. S. F. de Mel, former Mayor of Colombo.

References

External links

1894 births
1961 deaths
United National Party politicians
Deputy speakers and chairmen of committees of the Parliament of Sri Lanka
Members of the 1st Parliament of Ceylon
Mayors of Colombo
Ceylonese proctors
Alumni of Richmond College, Galle
People from Galle
People from British Ceylon
RA